Joan Perry (born Elizabeth Rosiland Miller; July 7, 1911 – September 16, 1996), was an American film actress, model, and singer. She was known as Betty Miller during her career as a model.

Early years
Perry attended Plant High School in Tampa, Florida.

Career
Perry gained early acting experience by participating in class plays in Tampa, Florida. In the early 1930s, Perry worked as a model in New York City. In 1935, she went to Hollywood and was signed under contract to Columbia Pictures, and during her time there, she co-starred with  actors such as Ronald Reagan, Ralph Bellamy, Lew Ayres, and Melvyn Douglas.

Following her leave from Columbia in the early 1940s, she went to Warner Bros.; her movies included International Squadron (1941) and Nine Lives Are Not Enough (1941).

When animators Bill Hanna and Joe Barbera planned to transfer their stock to Taft Broadcasting in the mid-1960's, Mrs. Perry came to the fore again and fought them over Harry Cohn's will.

Personal life 
Perry was married three times. On September 30, 1941, she wed Columbia Pictures mogul Harry Cohn in New York City. They remained married until his death in 1958. She later married Harry Karl in 1959 and then actor Laurence Harvey in 1968. She had a home in Palm Springs, California.

Death
Joan Perry died from emphysema in September 1996 at age 85 in Montecito, California. She is buried at Hollywood Forever Cemetery in Hollywood, California, under her original married name of Joan Cohn.

Filmography
 Heir to Trouble (1935)
 Case of the Missing Man (1935)
 Gallant Defender (1935)
 Dangerous Intrigue (1936)
 The Mysterious Avenger (1936)
 Shakedown (1936)
 Meet Nero Wolfe (1936)
 Blackmailer (1936)
 Counterfeit Lady (1936)
 The Devil Is Driving (1937)
 Start Cheering (1938)
 Blind Alley (1939)
 Good Girls Go to Paris (1939)
 The Lone Wolf Strikes (1940)
 Maisie Was a Lady (1940)
 Strange Alibi (1940)
 Bullets for O'Hara (1940)
 International Squadron (1941)
 Nine Lives Are Not Enough (1941)

References

External links

 

1911 births
1996 deaths
20th-century American actresses
American female models
American film actresses
Deaths from emphysema
Actresses from Palm Springs, California
Musicians from Pensacola, Florida
People from Montecito, California
Warner Bros. contract players
Burials at Hollywood Forever Cemetery